Year 215 (CCXV) was a common year starting on Sunday (link will display the full calendar) of the Julian calendar. At the time, it was known as the Year of the Consulship of Laetus and Sulla (or, less frequently, year 968 Ab urbe condita). The denomination 215 for this year has been used since the early medieval period, when the Anno Domini calendar era became the prevalent method in Europe for naming years.

Events 
 By place 

 Roman Empire 
 Caracalla's troops massacre the population of Alexandria, Egypt, beginning with the leading citizens. The emperor is angry about a satire, produced in Alexandria, mocking his claim that he killed Geta in self-defense.
 Caracalla introduces a new coin, the Antoninianus. The weight of this coin is a mere 1/50 of a pound.  Copper disappears gradually, and by the middle of the third century, with Rome's economy in crisis, the Antonianus will be the only official currency.

 China 
 Zhang Liao holds off Sun Quan's invasion force at the Battle of Xiaoyao Ford in Hefei, China.

 Caucasus 
 Vachagan I becomes king of Caucasian Albania.

Births 
 Huangfu Mi (or Shi'an), Chinese physician and poet (d. 282)

Deaths 
 Chen Wu, Chinese general serving under Sun Quan
 Clement of Alexandria, Greek scholar and philosopher
 Han Sui (or Wenyue), Chinese general and warlord
 Sun Yu, Chinese warlord  and cousin of Sun Quan (b. 177)
 Zhang Cheng, Chinese official serving under Cao Cao

References